Karen Nichole Young (born 6 June 1968) is a New Zealand-born Irish former cricketer who played as a right-handed batter and right-arm medium bowler. She appeared in one Test match and 19 One Day Internationals for Ireland between 2000 and 2003. She scored 58 in her only Test match, against Pakistan, as well as scoring 120 in an ODI in the same series.

References

External links
 
 

1968 births
Living people
Cricketers from Auckland
Ireland women Test cricketers
Ireland women One Day International cricketers